Cormorant Lake is a large lake in northern Manitoba, Canada. Administratively it is in Division 21, Northern Region of Manitoba, and almost entirely within the Cormorant Provincial Forest. There is one village and two hamlets on the east side of the lake along Via Rail's Winnipeg – Churchill rail line, the village of Cormorant and the hamlets  Halcrow and Dering. The Cormorant Lake Airport is between Cormorant and Dering. It is the former site of  a military base. It is now closed. There is one hamlet to the south of the lake, Budd, which is also on the rail line. The lake can be reached by road on Provincial Road 287 from just north of The Pas.

Cormorant Lake is in the Saskatchewan River basin and is primarily fed from the northeast from Mitchell Lake and Yawningstone Lake, and from the Southwest from Clearwater Lake and exits to the southeast into Moose Lake. There are two large islands in the western portion of the lake, and a chain of islands cutting northeast–southwest across the middle of the lake.

Notes

Lakes of Manitoba